Hadj is both a given name and a surname. Notable people with the name include:

Given name
Hadj Abderrahmane (1941-1981), Algerian actor
Hadj Belkheir (born 1977), Algerian boxer
Hadj Bouchiba (1903-1957), Algerian songwriter
Hadj Boudella (born 1965), Algerian man
Hadj Bouguèche (born 1983), Algerian footballer
Hadj Menouar (1913-1951), Algerian singer
Hadj M'rizek (1912-1955), Algerian songwriter
Hadj Sadok Bouziane (born 1987), Algerian footballer
Hadj Smaine Mohamed Seghir (born 1932), Algerian actor

Surname
Messali Hadj (1898-1974), Algerian politician

Other
Amir Hadj Massaoued (born 1982), Tunisian footballer
Ezzeddine Hadj Sassi (born 1962), Tunisian footballer
Lazhar Hadj Aïssa (born 1984), Algerian footballer
Othmane Hadj Lazib (born 1983), Algerian hurdler
Said Hadj Mansour, Palestinian footballer
Rashi Ali Hadj Matumla (born 1968), Tanzanian boxer
Samir Si Hadj Mohand (born 1982), Algerian footballer
Tarek Hadj Adlane (born 1965), Algerian footballer

See also
Hadj Mechri, town
Ali Benhadj (born 1956), Algerian man